The 2020 BAL Qualifying Tournaments were the inaugural qualifying tournaments of the Basketball Africa League (BAL), the newly launched premier basketball league of Africa jointly organized by the NBA and FIBA. While the NBA will co-organise from the regular season, the qualifiers are completely organised by FIBA Africa. 

A total of 31 teams from 31 countries participate in the qualifying tournaments in order to determine which six teams will play in the 2020 BAL regular season, along with six directly placed six teams. The qualifying tournaments are divided into the First Round and Second Round, which run from 16 October until 21 December 2019.

Team allocation
A total of 31 teams from 31 countries played in the qualifying tournaments. League positions after eventual playoffs of the previous season shown in parentheses. On 9 October 2019 the official list of participating teams in the qualifying rounds was announced by FIBA.

Notes

First round

In the first round, thirtytwo teams participate in six groups divided over two geographical divisions (West and East). Groups were selected by geographical criteria. The winners and runners-up of each group qualify for the second round while four other teams were invited with wild cards, chosen by FIBA.

The first games were played at 15 October and the last on 3 November 2019.

West Division

Group A
Venue: Bamako, Mali

Group B
Venue: Cotonou, Benin

Group C
Venue: Libreville, Gabon

Division West

Group D
Venue: Dar es Salaam, Tanzania

Group E
Venue: Johannesburg, South Africa

Group F
Venue: Antananarivo, Madagascar

Second round
In the Second Round (also referred to as "Elite 16" by FIBA), the sixteen teams that advanced from the first round teams play in four groups of four, divided over two geographical divisions. The top two teams of each group advance to the semi-finals. Winners of each semi-finals qualify for the regular season while the losers play in a third place game for the final regular season spot. On 7 November, FIBA announced the four wild card receivers.

The Division West tournament will be played at the Kigali Arena in the Rwandan city of Kigali. The Division East tournament is played in the Multipurpose Sports Complex in Yaoundé, Cameroon. The Elite 16 will start on 26 November and end 22 December 2019.

Qualified teams 
The draw was held on 21 November in Abidjan.

West Division – Group G

Group A

Group B

Final round
Qualification finals

Semi-finals

Third place game

Final

East Division – Group H

Group A

Group B

Final round
;Qualification finals

Semi-finals

Third place game

Final

Statistical leaders
As retrieved from FIBA.

Individual statistics leaders

Individual game highs

Notes

References

2020 Q
Qualifiers
2019 in African basketball
2020 in African basketball
2019–20 in basketball leagues